Barassi is an Italian surname. People with the name include:

 Abd-Rabbo al-Barassi, Libyan politician
 Carlo Barassi (1910–?), Italian alpine skier
 Eugenio Mimica Barassi (1949–2021), Chilean writer
 Hanane Al-Barassi (1963–2020), Libyan activist
 Ludovico Barassi (1873–1956), Italian jurist
 Ottorino Barassi (1898–1971), Italian sports official
 Pierre-Louis Barassi (born 1998), French rugby union player 
 Ron Barassi (born 1936), Australian rules football player and coach
 Ron Barassi Sr. (1913–1941), Australian rules football player 
 Ron Hitler-Barassi, stage name of Peter Minack, Australian musician and teacher

Italian-language surnames